Mirza Golubica (born 18 May 1965 in Ribarice) is a Serbian-born Bosnian-Herzegovinian football manager and former player.

Club career
During his playing career, he has played as forward for a great number of clubs.  He started playing in Yugoslav Second Division clubs FK Trepča and NK Čelik Zenica before moving, in 1990 to Spain to play one season with Xerez CD in the Segunda División. Next season he was back to play in the last edition of the Yugoslav First League with FK Borac Banja Luka. In summer 1992 he moved to Croatia and played with NK Varteks in the first edition of the Croatian First League and he would play there for most of the 1990s. Beside playing with Varteks, where he will return in two more occasions, he also played for several other Croatian clubs, such as HNK Segesta, HNK Cibalia, NK Mladost 127, beside playing the first half of the 1995–96 season with Croatian giants NK Dinamo Zagreb (called "Croatia Zagreb" in that period) winning with them both, the national championship and also the Croatian Cup. During this period, he also had mostly short spells abroad, like in 1993 with Turkish Super League club Karşıyaka S.K., or 1994 with Slovenian First League club NK Publikum Celje and also in the 1996–97 season with 1. FC Nürnberg playing in the German 3. Liga that year. He retired in 2001 while playing with Aris Limassol F.C. in the Cypriot First Division.

After retiring, he has become a football manager.

External sources
 
 
 
 

1965 births
Living people
People from Loznica
Bosniaks of Serbia
Association football forwards
Yugoslav footballers
Bosnia and Herzegovina footballers
FK Trepča players
NK Čelik Zenica players
Xerez CD footballers
FK Borac Banja Luka players
NK Varaždin players
Karşıyaka S.K. footballers
NK Celje players
HNK Segesta players
GNK Dinamo Zagreb players
HNK Cibalia players
1. FC Nürnberg players
HNK Suhopolje players
Aris Limassol FC players
Yugoslav First League players
Segunda División players
Croatian Football League players
Süper Lig players
Slovenian PrvaLiga players
Regionalliga players
Cypriot First Division players
Yugoslav expatriate footballers
Expatriate footballers in Spain
Yugoslav expatriate sportspeople in Spain
Bosnia and Herzegovina expatriate footballers
Expatriate footballers in Croatia
Bosnia and Herzegovina expatriate sportspeople in Croatia
Expatriate footballers in Turkey
Bosnia and Herzegovina expatriate sportspeople in Turkey
Expatriate footballers in Slovenia
Bosnia and Herzegovina expatriate sportspeople in Slovenia
Expatriate footballers in Germany
Bosnia and Herzegovina expatriate sportspeople in Germany
Expatriate footballers in Cyprus
Bosnia and Herzegovina expatriate sportspeople in Cyprus
Bosnia and Herzegovina football managers
NK Travnik managers